Chris Kentis is an American film director and screenwriter.

Career 
Kentis is known for directing such films as Grind, Open Water, and Silent House.

References

External links

American film directors
Living people
American screenwriters
1962 births